Sally Forth was an American comic strip created by Wally Wood for a military male readership, featuring a sexy action-adventure character who is often depicted nude. Her name is a play on words"to sally forth" means to leave or attack from a military encampment.

It is unrelated to Sally Forth (Greg Howard comic strip), a daily newspaper comic strip about an American housewife that began in 1982.

Overview 

Sally Forth began as a recruit in a commando unit in the June 1968 Military News, a 16-page tabloid from Armed Forces Diamond Sales. 

In 1976, Wood recalled:

Sally returned July 26, 1971, in the Overseas Weekly, a tabloid intended for U.S. military men serving outside North America. With Wood getting an assist from writer-artists Nick Cuti, Paul Kirchner and Larry Hama, Sally Forth continued in the Overseas Weekly until April 22, 1974. The Sally Forth comics were translated into Dutch during the late 1970s. The character was named Doortje Stoot and it appeared in the male-oriented magazine Gummi.

Wood collected the strip in a series of four oversize (10"x12") magazines. In 1993–95, writer-editor Bill Pearson, Wood's friend and an associate of the Wood Studio, reformatted the strips into a series of comics published by Eros Comix, an imprint of Fantagraphics Books. During 1998, Pearson edited the entire run into a single 160-page volume also published by Fantagraphics.

Near the end of his life, two pornographic Sally Forth stories featuring Sally and Bill Yonder were created and published by Wood in the adult comic book series Gang Bang #1 in 1980 and #2 in 1981.

Characters

Sally Forth — Provides fan service and distractions to enemy males.
Lt. Q. P. Dahl — Commander of the unit, who is half the height of everyone else and looks like a child. The name is a play on the phrase "kewpie doll".
Kicky McCann — Martial arts expert.
Wild Bill Yonder — The team's pilot. The name is a play on the phrase "wild blue yonder", meaning sky.
Hairy James — Weapons and demolitions expert.
Snorky — resident Martian.

See also 
The Adventures of Pussycat
 Little Annie Fanny
 Torchy

External links
Sally Forth at Don Markstein's Toonopedia

1968 comics debuts
1974 comics endings
1980 comics debuts
1981 comics endings
Adult comic strips
Forth, Sally
Forth, Sally
Comics about women
Forth, Sally
Erotic comics
Fantagraphics titles
Forth, Sally
Fictional American military personnel
Sally Forth